Rusanov is a Russian masculine surname, its feminine counterpart is Rusanova. It may refer to:

Anatoly Rusanov (born 1932), Russian chemist
Dmitri Rusanov (born 1987), Russian football player
Lyubov Rusanova (born 1954), Russian swimmer 
Nikolay Rusanov (1859–1939), Russian revolutionary
Vladimir Rusanov (1875–c. 1913), Russian geologist
Vladislav Rusanov (writer) (born 1966), Ukrainian fantasy writer
Yuliya Rusanova (born 1986), Russian runner

See also
Mount Rusanov in Antarctica

Russian-language surnames